The Illinois Senate is the upper chamber of the Illinois General Assembly, the legislative branch of the government of the State of Illinois in the United States.  The body was created by the first state constitution adopted in 1818.  Under the Illinois Constitution of 1970, the Illinois Senate is made up of 59 senators elected from individual legislative districts determined by population and redistricted every 10 years; based on the 2020 U.S. census each senator represents approximately 213,347 people.  Senators are divided into three groups, each group having a two-year term at a different part of the decade between censuses, with the rest of the decade being taken up by two four-year terms. This ensures that the Senate reflects changes made when the General Assembly redistricts itself after each census.

Usually, depending on the election year, roughly one-third or two-thirds of Senate seats are contested. On rare occasions (usually after a census), all Senate seats are up for election. In contrast, the Illinois House of Representatives is made up of 118 members with its entire membership elected to two-year terms. House districts are formed by dividing each Senate district in half, with each senator having two "associated" representatives.

The Illinois Senate convenes at the Illinois State Capitol in Springfield, Illinois. Its first official working day is the second Wednesday of January each year. Its primary duties are to pass bills into law, approve the state budget, confirm appointments to state departments and agencies, act on federal constitutional amendments and propose constitutional amendments for Illinois. It also has the power to override gubernatorial vetoes through a three-fifths majority vote. The Illinois Senate tries impeachments made by the House of Representatives, and can convict impeached officers by a two-thirds vote.

Voting in the Illinois Senate is done by members pushing one of three buttons.  Unlike most states, the Illinois Senate allows members to vote yes, no, or present. It takes 30 affirmative votes to pass legislation during final action. The number of negative votes does not matter.  Therefore, voting present has the same effect on the tally as voting no.

Party summary

Leadership
, the 102nd General Assembly of the Illinois Senate consists of the following leadership:

Majority
President of the Senate: Don Harmon
Majority Leader: Kimberly A. Lightford
Assistant Majority Leader/President Pro Tempore: Bill Cunningham
Deputy Majority Leaders:
Laura Murphy
Emil Jones III
Assistant Majority Leaders:
Jacqueline Y. Collins
Linda Holmes
Dave Koehler
Antonio Munoz
Majority Caucus Chair: Mattie Hunter
Majority Caucus Whips:
Omar Aquino
Michael Hastings
Napoleon Harris III
Julie Morrison

Minority
Minority Leader: Dan McConchie
Deputy Minority Leader: Sue Rezin
Assistant Minority Leaders:
Don DeWitte
Steve McClure
Jason Plummer
Chapin Rose
Minority Caucus Chair: Jason Barickman
Minority Caucus Whips:
Dave Syverson
Jil Tracy

Officers
Secretary of the Senate: Tim Anderson
Assistant Secretary of the Senate: Scott Kaiser
Sergeant-at-Arms: Joe Dominguez
Assistant Sergeant-at-Arms: Dirk R. Eilers

Members
In 1924, Florence Fifer Bohrer became the body's first female member and Adelbert H. Roberts became its first African American member. In 1977, Earlean Collins became the first African American woman to serve in the Illinois Senate. Barack Obama, later the first African-American President of the United States, served in the Illinois Senate from 1997 to 2004.

, the 103rd General Assembly of the Illinois Senate consists of the following members:

 Ɨ Legislator was appointed to the Illinois Senate prior to initial election.
 ƗƗ Legislator was appointed to the Illinois Senate after being elected, but prior to inauguration day of the General Assembly to which they were elected.

Past composition of the Senate

References

External links
Illinois General Assembly – Senate official government website
Illinois Senate Republicans official party website
Illinois Senate Democrats official party website
 Legislature of Illinois at Project Vote Smart

Senate
State upper houses in the United States
1818 establishments in Illinois Territory